Mariaposching is a municipality in the district of Straubing-Bogen in Bavaria, Germany. It is a member of the municipal association Schwarzach.

It is located on the river Danube.

References

Straubing-Bogen
Populated places on the Danube